Phyllocoptes eupadi (Newkirk, 1984) is a mite that chemically induces a pouch gall to develop as a sub-spherical distortion rising up from the upper surface of the lamina of leaves of blackthorn shrubs Prunus padus, Prunus spinosa and other Prunus species. Synonyms are Phytoptus padi Nalepa, 1890 and "Eriophyes padi (Nalepa, 1890)", non Eriophyes padi Domes, 2000.

Description
The gall's appearance on the upper surface is sub-spherical pustules, hairy and opening below, often clustering along the midrib, but also found over the whole leaf lamina surface and may vary in colour from pale yellow-green to deep red. The adult mite lives on sap, sucked from the cell tissues. The leaf surface can be so densely covered with galls that it becomes deformed and wrinkled.

Distribution
The species is found in Denmark as well as in England and Scotland.

Gallery

References
Notes

Sources
 Hancy, Rex (2000). The Study of Plant Galls in Norfolk. The Norfolk and Norwich Naturalists' Trust. 
 Redfern M. and Shirley P. (2002). British Plant Galls. FSC Publications. .
 Stubbs, F.B. ed. (1986). Provisional Keys to British Plant Galls. British Plant Gall Society. .

External links
 NLBIF

Arachnids of Europe
Eriophyidae
Animals described in 1984